Nesovice is a municipality and village in Vyškov District in the South Moravian Region of the Czech Republic. It has about 1,100 inhabitants.

Administrative parts
The village of Letošov is an administrative part of Nesovice.

Notable people
Joseph von Petrasch (1714–1772), scholar and writer; lived and died here

References

Villages in Vyškov District